Guyanese English Creole (Creolese by its speakers or simply Gayiniiz) is an English-based creole language spoken by the Guyanese people. Linguistically, it is similar to other English dialects of the Caribbean region, based on 19th-century English and has loan words from African, Indian, Arawakan, and older Dutch languages.

Varieties and influences 
There are many sub-dialects of Guyanese Creole based on geographical location, urban - rural location, and race of the speakers. For example, along the Rupununi River, where the population is largely Amerindian, a distinct form of Guyanese Creole exists. The Georgetown (capital city) urban area has a distinct accent, while within a forty-five-minute drive away from this area the dialect/accent changes again, especially if following the coast where rural villages are located.

As with other Caribbean languages, words and phrases are very elastic, and new ones can be made up, changed or evolve within a short period. They can also be used within a very small group, until picked up by a larger community. Ethnic groups are also known to alter or include words from their own backgrounds.

A socially stratified creole speech continuum also exists between Guyanese English and Standard / British English. Speech by members of the upper classes is phonetically closest to British and American English, whereas speech by members of the lower classes most closely resembles other Caribbean English dialects. A phrase such as "I told him" may be pronounced in various parts of the continuum:

Grammar
It is common in Guyanese Creole to repeat adjectives and adverbs for emphasis (the equivalent of adding "very" or "extremely" in standard British and American English). For example, "Dis wata de col col" translates into "This water is very cold". "Come now now" translates into "Come right now."

Phonology 
There are several phonological markers that are present in Guyanese Creole:

 Guyanese Creole is isomorphic with the Jamaican phoneme system
 TH stopping
 Cluster reduction
 H dropping
 Semivowels
 Non-rhoticity among older speakers

Sample words and phrases
The following phrases are written as they are pronounced:
  - Meaning: "I will do it"
  - Literally: "they want to sting your one bill" - Meaning: "they usually want to take money from you"
  - Literally: "Every day I run the ricefield" - Meaning: "Every day I take care of the ricefield"
  - Literally: "He been get gun" - "he had the gun"
  - Literally: "it would have taken us a little time but we would have come out safely"
  - Meaning: "I'm working further inland"

See also
 Nation language
 Jamaican patois
 Sranan Tongo 
 Creole language
 Spanglish

References

External links 

 Phonology and speech examples
 Guyana based detective stories written in East Bank Demerara Creole. Includes glossary of Creole Words and Guyanese Proverbs.

Analytic languages
Caribbean English
English-based pidgins and creoles
Isolating languages
Languages of Guyana
Languages of the African diaspora
Creoles of the Americas